Hydrus is a small constellation in the southern sky.

Hydrus may also refer to:
 Hydrus (Chinese astronomy), constellations recognized in China
 Hydrus (legendary creature), a creature from Medieval bestiaries
 Hydrus (roller coaster), a Gerstlauer Euro-Fighter roller coaster at Casino Pier
 Hydrus (software), a software suite for simulating subsurface water flow
 SS Hydrus, a Great Lakes freighter
 The 7th Colossus from Shadow of the Colossus

See also 
 Hydros (disambiguation)